Nelder Grove, located in the western Sierra Nevada within the Sierra National Forest in Madera County, California, is a Giant sequoia grove that was formerly known as Fresno Grove. The grove is a  tract containing 54 mature Giant Sequoia (Sequoiadendron giganteum) trees, the largest concentration of giant sequoias in the Sierra National Forest. The grove also contains several historical points of interest, including pioneer cabins and giant sequoia stumps left by 19th century loggers. 

Before European Americans arrived, there were 400 mature sequoias in Nelder Grove, but the population has seen several steep declines since then. About 70% of the mature trees were cut during the late 19th century timber era. Despite federal protection in the 20th century, the population of sequoias has been further impacted by decades of fire exclusion, with 38 trees killed in the Railroad Fire of 2017. Currently, only 54 mature specimens remain in the grove.

Ecology 

Nelder Grove is a montane forest dominated by giant sequoias and other tree species such as ponderosa pine (P. ponderosa), white fir (Abies concolor), and California incense-cedar (Calocedrus decurrens).. The giant sequoia trees in Nelder Grove have a low level of genetic diversity, even within the standards of their species. This limited genetic variation makes the Nelder Grove particularly vulnerable to the effects of climate change, making it a priority for conservation efforts.

Besides trees, the grove is also habitat for rare plants such as the mountain-lady slipper orchid and the veined water lichen. Native animal species include black bear (Ursus americanus),
mule deer (Odocoileus hemionus), long-tailed weasel (Neogale frenata),
raccoon (Procyon lotor), gray squirrel (Sciurus griseus), chipmunk (Neotamias minimus), and flying squirrels (Glaucomys sabrinus).

History

Native people
The Nelder Grove has a rich history of human occupation dating back as far as 15,000 years ago.. The Mono and Miwok tribes seasonally occupied the area, using it as a hub for their trans-Sierra journeys. Other tribes, including the Dumma, Heuchi, Chuckchansi, Chowchillas, Paiute, Kechayi, and Dalinchi, also traversed the area. Evidence of their presence can be found throughout the grove, including mortar holes used for grinding acorns into flour.

Exploration and naming
In 1858, conservationist Galen Clark made the formal discovery of the Nelder Grove. At the time, he named it Fresno Grove, as it was part of Fresno County and included the headwaters of the Fresno River. However, a 1957 discovery of a soldier's diary revealed that a small detachment of the Mariposa Battalion had passed through the grove during the Mariposa War in 1851.

The grove is now named for John A. Nelder, known as the "Hermit of the Fresno Forest" by John Muir. Nelder, who came to California during the 1849 gold rush, filed a homestead claim for 165 acres within the grove in 1874 and built a cabin near its largest tree the following year. Muir wrote about Nelder and the grove for The Atlantic Monthly in 1878, later including it in his book Our National Parks.

John Nelder was killed in 1889 when a fire consumed his cabin.  His son inherited his estate and deeded it to the Madera Flume and Trading Company in 1892.

Timber era

Nelder Grove was subjected to extensive logging in the late 19th century. The Madera Flume and Trading Company logged 277 mature sequoias, each measuring over four feet in diameter, between 1880 and 1892. Many of the surrounding trees, including sugar pines, ponderosa pines, white firs, and incense-cedars were also clearcut.

The logging process in the grove was grueling, with horse and oxen teams hauling heavy wagons of logs to the mill. The arrival of a  Dolbeer single spool donkey, a steam-powered winch, made the work easier in later years.

By 1897, the area close to the mill had been completely logged, and the last sequoia in Nelder Grove was cut. In 1928, the Madera Sugar Pine Company transferred the land to the United States Forest Service, which placed the grove under federal protection.

Noteworthy trees

The Nelder Grove is home to several giant sequoias that are notable for their size and history.
Nelder Tree: The largest tree in the grove, named after homesteader John Nelder who built a cabin near its base in 1875. Measuring  it's the 22nd largest giant sequoia in the world.
Forest King: This giant sequoia was cut down in 1870 and toured the United States as an exhibition tree. The stump was rediscovered in 2003.
Bull Buck Tree: Named after the felling foreman of the logging camp or "boss of the woods." Once believed to be the world's second-largest tree, the Bull Buck measures 246 feet (75 m) tall with a ground-level circumference of 100 feet (30 m) but a relatively smaller volume of 27,383 cubic feet (775.4 m3), placing it 43rd on the list of largest giant sequoias. The tree is an estimated  years old.
Old Grandad Tree: A tremendously rugged tree atop a hill, the tree is dead and hollow at the top and bears four significant fire scars.
Old Forester Tree: This tree is the tallest in the Nelder Grove campground area (at 299 ft.). The tree is named after Walter Puhn, who was a National Forest Supervisor in the 1960s.
Big Ed Tree: This tree is named after Ed Zerlang, a Soquel Mill foreman. It was Ed's favorite giant sequoia, and can be reached today by a short trail.

Access
Nelder Grove is relatively inaccessible compared to the nearby Mariposa Grove, which is easily reached by paved roads and shuttle buses. Visitors can reach Nelder Grove, under favorable conditions, within two hours from the Fresno area by traveling north, or from Yosemite National Park by traveling south on Highway 41 to Road 632, also known as Sky Ranch Road. However, the dirt road leading into the grove can be challenging, with muddy and rutted conditions, and is often blocked by deep snow in the winter months.

Hiking and Recreation
The Shadow of the Giants National Recreation Trail is a nature trail located in the Nelder Grove of giant sequoias. It was built in 1965 and officially designated as a National Recreation Trail in 1978. However, in 2015, the trail's informational panels, bridges, and other improvements were destroyed by the Railroad Fire. As of 2022, the trail remains closed and is overgrown with brush. 

Additionally, there is a Sierra National Forest campground located at the Nelder Grove which serves as a spot for camping and outdoor activities.

Structures and Buildings

The Nelder Grove interpretive center has on display a number of artifacts from the area's logging days, including two restored cabins and replicas of cross-log and two-pole log chutes. These cabins were originally constructed in the late 1800s by pioneers at nearby Bildeo Meadow, and were moved to Nelder Grove in the 1980s as part of an effort funded by the National Historic Preservation Act. They are among the oldest cabins in the Sierra National Forest.

Railroad Fire
In September 2017, the devastating Railroad Fire swept through much of Nelder Grove. The inferno claimed 38 of the grove's 92 monarch trees and forced the permanent closure of the popular Shadow of the Giants trail.

Experts say a variety of factors contributed to the wildfire's destructive behavior, including the historic 2011–2017 California drought, which had led to extensive foliage dieback and other stress responses in the giant sequoias. Furthermore, a century of fire exclusion had resulted in heavy fuel accumulation on the forest floor and an overgrowth of understory vegetation, leading to more intense burning.

Concerned forest monitors had been warning of the risk of such a fire for decades. As early as the 1960s, Madera County had discussed plans to acquire the grove in order to sidestep federal limitations on timber cutting and prescribed burning in the Sierra National Forest. Despite these warnings, no major preventative measures were taken ahead of the Railroad Fire. "We'd better reduce the fuels, or we're going to lose this resource," warned Paul Rich, a retired 33-year veteran of the U.S. Forest Service in 2000.

Protection
In August 2022, the USDA began a hazardous fuel reduction program in Nelder Grove. Officials hope to build upon the success of wildfire prevention programs in nearby Mariposa Grove during the 2022 Washburn Fire. The plentiful natural regeneration of seedlings is a source of optimism for other groves with large, severe burn scars.

See also 
List of giant sequoia groves
Mariposa Grove - the nearest neighboring giant sequoia grove.
Converse Basin Grove - a giant sequoia grove that was logged extensively in the 19th and early 20th centuries.

External links 
 Friends of Nelder Grove

References 

Giant sequoia groves
Sierra National Forest
Protected areas of Madera County, California